Abou Traoré is a Guinean politician who represents the constituency of Faranah Prefecture. He is a member of the Majority Rally of the Guinean People Party of former president Alpha Conde.

References

Members of the National Assembly (Guinea)
Living people
Year of birth missing (living people)